Tazewell County is a county in the U.S. state of Illinois. According to the 2010 census, it had a population of 135,394. Its county seat and largest city is Pekin. It is pronounced with a short "a", to rhyme with "razz" rather than "raze."

Tazewell County is part of the Peoria, IL Metropolitan Statistical Area. The majority of the population lives along the county's western border.

History
Tazewell County was formed out of Peoria County in 1827. The consensus appears to be that it was named in honor of Littleton Tazewell, who served in the U.S. Senate, and who became Governor of Virginia in 1834. It is, however, possible that it was named after Littleton's father, prominent Virginia politician Henry Tazewell, after whom Tazewell County, Virginia, was named.

Geography

Climate and weather

Adjacent counties
 Peoria County (northwest)
 Woodford County (north)
 McLean County (east)
 Logan County (south)
 Mason County (southwest)
 Fulton County (west)

Transportation

Major highways

  Interstate 74
  Interstate 155
  Interstate 474
  U.S. Highway 24
  U.S. Highway 150
  Illinois Route 8
  Illinois Route 9
  Illinois Route 29
  Illinois Route 98
  Illinois Route 116
  Illinois Route 122

Airports
The following public-use airports are located in Tazewell County:
 Pekin Municipal Airport (C15) - serves Pekin (Located by the Village of South Pekin, Illinois)
 Manito Mitchell Airport (C45) - serves Manito, a village in Mason County

Public Transportation
Bus and paratransit service in Tazewell County is provided by Peoria's “CityLink” system, operating six routes (four originating from Peoria) seven days a week.

Demographics

As of the 2010 United States Census, there were 135,394 people, 54,146 households, and 37,163 families living in the county. The racial makeup of the county was 96.2% white, 1.0% black or African American, 0.7% Asian, 0.3% American Indian, 0.5% from other races, and 1.3% from two or more races. Those of Hispanic or Latino origin made up 1.9% of the population. In terms of ancestry, 35.6% were German, 15.6% were American, 14.4% were Irish, and 12.0% were English.

Of the 54,146 households, 31.4% had children under the age of 18 living with them, 54.2% were married couples living together, 10.2% had a female householder with no husband present, 31.4% were non-families, and 26.3% of all households were made up of individuals. The average household size was 2.45 and the average family size was 2.94. The median age was 39.8 years.

The median income for a household in the county was $54,232 and the median income for a family was $66,764. Males had a median income of $50,372 versus $34,747 for females. The per capita income for the county was $27,036. About 6.3% of families and 7.9% of the population were below the poverty line, including 11.2% of those under age 18 and 4.5% of those age 65 or over.

Communities

Cities 
 Delavan
 East Peoria
 Marquette Heights
 Pekin (seat)
 Washington

Villages 

 Armington
 Creve Coeur
 Deer Creek (partly in Woodford County)
 Goodfield (partly in Woodford County)
 Green Valley
 Hopedale
 Mackinaw
 Minier
 Morton
 North Pekin
 Peoria Heights (mostly in Peoria County)
 South Pekin
 Tremont

Census-designated place
 Heritage Lake

Other unincorporated communities 

 Allentown
 Cooper
 Dillon
 Groveland
 Midway
 Parkland
 Sutter
 Winkel

Townships 
Tazewell County is divided into these townships:

 Boynton
 Cincinnati
 Deer Creek
 Delavan
 Dillon
 Elm Grove
 Fondulac
 Groveland
 Hittle
 Hopedale
 Little Mackinaw
 Mackinaw
 Malone
 Morton
 Pekin
 Sand Prairie
 Spring Lake
 Tremont
 Washington

Politics
Tazewell County has been solidly Republican on the national level, voting for the Republican candidate for U.S. president since 1996.

See also
 National Register of Historic Places listings in Tazewell County, Illinois

Notable people

 Charles "Buffalo" Jones, cowboy and naturalist

References

 
Illinois counties
Peoria metropolitan area, Illinois
1827 establishments in Illinois
Populated places established in 1827